Caroline Pierce McMillan (born 2 August 1963) is an English professional golfer who played on the LPGA Tour after she won the Qualifying School in 1988. She has played under both her maiden name, Caroline Pierce, and her married name, Caroline McMillan.

Pierce won once on the LPGA Tour in 1996.

Professional wins

LPGA Tour wins (1)

Futures Tour
1987 First Union Classic, Lynx-Tigress Open

References

English female golfers
LPGA Tour golfers
Sportspeople from Cheshire
1963 births
Living people